Mitchell v. United States, 526 U.S. 314 (1999), is a United States Supreme Court case  that considered two 
Fifth Amendment privileges related to a criminal defendant’s rights  against self-incrimination in a Federal District Court. The court ruled that a defendant who waives the guilty plea does not also waive the privilege during the sentencing phase of the trial, and that the court cannot draw an adverse inference from the defendant's silence when determining facts related to the crime which affect the severity of the sentence.

Circumstances
Amanda Mitchell was indicted, along with co-defendants, for one count of conspiracy to distribute five or more kilograms of  cocaine and pleaded guilty.  However, Mitchell reserved the right to contest the drug quantity   under the conspiracy count during her sentencing hearing. She was told before her plea was accepted, that she faced a mandatory minimum sentence of one year in prison for the conspiracy offense and a mandatory minimum of ten years in prison  if the prosecution could prove the amount of cocaine involved was the required five kilograms necessary for the longer sentence. Mitchell was told that by making a guilty plea she was waiving her Fifth Amendment right to remain silent during the trial. 

During the sentencing hearing, the District Court heard testimony from some of Mitchell's codefendants, that the amount of Mitchell's alleged drug sales put her over the five-kilogram threshold. Although Mitchell did not testify in defense of the government's changes regarding the quantity of the drug, her counsel argued that the quantity of cocaine attributable to her for sentencing purposes was less than the threshold. The District Court ruled that as a result of her guilty plea, Mitchell  had forfeited the right to remain silent about the crime's details. The District Court accepted  the testimony of her  co-defendants' that  put her over the five-kilogram threshold and that therefore  the 10-year minimum sentence was mandated. It also noted that her failure to testify contributed to the court's decision  to accept the co-defendants' testimony. The Court of Appeals affirmed this decision.

Decision
The court held that a guilty plea is not also  a waiver of the privilege at sentencing. It also held that the trial court may not draw adverse inference  by the defendant's silence while facts bearing upon the severity of the sentence are considered. Any inference of the defendant's silence advocates that a court's ruling can be made on assumption. The court's decision supported that a ruling should be made based on facts. In addition, had the court allowed for an inference to be made from silence, suspicions would then inherently supersede and contradict the principle that defendants are innocent until proven guilty.

See also
 List of United States Supreme Court cases, volume 526
 List of United States Supreme Court cases
 Lists of United States Supreme Court cases by volume

Footnotes

External links
 

United States Supreme Court cases
United States Fifth Amendment self-incrimination case law
1999 in United States case law
United States Supreme Court cases of the Rehnquist Court